Breakable You is a 2017 American comedy-drama film written and directed by Andrew Wagner and starring Holly Hunter, Tony Shalhoub and Alfred Molina. It is based on Brian Morton's 2006 novel of the same name. It premiered at the Palm Springs International Film Festival and was released digitally on March 13, 2018.

Synopsis
A couple's divorce has profound reverberations for their entire extended family.

Cast
Holly Hunter as Eleanor Weller
Tony Shalhoub as Adam Weller
Alfred Molina as Paul Weller
Cristin Milioti as Maud Weller
Omar Metwally as Samir Kamali
Caroline Aaron as Judith Singer
Brooke Adams as Ruth Frank

References

External links
 
 

American comedy-drama films
Films based on American novels
Works by Brian Morton
2017 comedy-drama films
2010s English-language films
2010s American films